Western Suburbs is a term used to refer to the western part of a city, or things associated with such a region. In particular, it may refer to
Western Suburbs (Melbourne), encompassing the cities of Brimbank, Maribyrnong, Melton and Wyndham in Melbourne, Australia
Western Suburbs (Mumbai), a region in Mumbai, India
Western Suburbs (Perth), a group of suburbs of Perth, Western Australia
Western Suburbs (Sydney), or Greater Western Sydney (encompassing Western Sydney and Macarthur regions), Australia
Western Sydney, a region of Sydney, Australia

Football clubs

Association (soccer)
Western Suburbs SC, a VSL team in Melbourne, Australia
Western Suburbs SC (NSW), a former NSL team in Sydney, Australia
Western Suburbs FC, a football club in Porirua, New Zealand

Rugby league
Western Suburbs Magpies, a NSWRL team in Sydney, Australia
Western Suburbs Panthers, a QRL team in Brisbane, Australia
Western Suburbs Red Devils, a rugby league team in Figtree, NSW
Western Suburbs Rosellas, a rugby league team in Newcastle, NSW

Rugby union
Western District RUFC (Wests Lions), a rugby union club in Canberra, Australia
Western Suburbs District RUFC (West Harbour), a rugby union club in Sydney, Australia
Western Suburbs RFC (Wellington), a rugby union club in Wellington, New Zealand
Western Suburbs RUFC (Wests Bulldogs), a rugby union club in Brisbane, Queensland, Australia

See also
Wests (disambiguation)